Hubert F. "Hub" Reed (born October 4, 1936) is a retired American professional basketball player born in Harrah, Oklahoma.

A 6'9" center from Oklahoma City University under famous coach Abe Lemons, Reed played in the National Basketball Association from 1958 to 1965 as a member of the St. Louis Hawks, Cincinnati Royals, Los Angeles Lakers, and Detroit Pistons. He averaged 5.5 points and 5.1 rebounds over his career.

Notes

1936 births
Living people
American men's basketball players
Basketball players from Oklahoma
Centers (basketball)
Cincinnati Royals players
Detroit Pistons players
Los Angeles Lakers players
Oklahoma City Stars men's basketball players
People from Oklahoma County, Oklahoma
St. Louis Hawks draft picks
St. Louis Hawks players